Ian Porter (born April 12, 1965, in Newport Pagnell, UK) is an English actor.

Early career
Ian Porter's family hails from Coventry, but his family moved to Los Angeles when he was only 1 year old. He lived in Torrance, California until he graduated from Long Beach State University. He has been living and working in Britain since 1988.

Theatre
 Justin Moskova and Albert Palmer in Rare Earth Mettle at the Royal Court Theatre
Sheriff Talbott in Orpheus Descending at the Menier Chocolate Factory / Theatre Clwyd
Hershey Green in Desperate Measures at Clerkenwell Prison
Buzzy Banks in The Trial of Jane Fonda at The Assembly Rooms, Edinburgh
 Bill Ray in On Golden Pond at the Salisbury Playhouse
 Boolie in Driving Miss Daisy UK tour 2012 (starring Gwen Taylor and Don Warrington)
 Slim in Of Mice And Men at the Watermill Theatre
 Company member in August:Osage County at the National Theatre
 You Can’t Take It With You and The Archbishop’s Ceiling at Southwark Playhouse
 Road to Nirvana at the King's Head
 Voices From September 11 at the Old Vic
 Danny Bouncing and The Glass Menagerie at Derby Playhouse
 Sideman and Burning Blue in the West End
 All My Sons at Bristol Old Vic
 Crimes of the Heart at The Man in the Moon Theatre.

Filmography

Film
 The Unlikely Pilgrimage of Harold Fry as Jim 
The Phantom of the Open  as Dick Nelson
The King's Man as American General
How to Stop a Recurring Dream as Rambler
Angel Has Fallen as Fox Reporter
Dumbo as Cavendish (uncredited)
Beirut as Jerry
Angel of Decay as Hergesheimer
Survivor as Concierge #2
Gulliver's Travels as Business Desk Editor
Finding Rin Tin Tin as Lieutenant Bryant
Mr Bean's Holiday as Newsreader
Dark Corners as News Anchor
LVJ (TBA) as Colonel Anderson
Alien Autopsy as Pentagon Officer
The Bourne Ultimatum
The Jacket as Major
The Defender as Newell
Spy Game as US Reporter
Saving Private Ryan as Trask
The Steal as Beggar

Television
 Living The Dream as Morton Welch
Patriot as Macmillan Competitor
Ransom as Joe Hearst
Someone You Thought You Knew as Mark
Bliss as Jess
I Live With Models as Pete
The Crown as State Dept Aid
Obsession: Dark Desires (2015, documentary) as Narrator
The Eichmann Show (2015, TV Movie) as Male Journalist
Utopia (2014) as Scientist
24: Live Another Day (2014) as Submarine Captain McColl
The Execution of Gary Glitter (2009, TV Movie) as Reverend David Sanders
Moon Shot (2008, TV Movie) as Bill Anders
True Heroes (2008)
Bonekickers (2008) as George Washington
Banged Up Abroad (2008) as Mark Ross
Doctor Who (2007) as Hybrid / Foreman
Hotel Babylon (2006) as Mr. Pullins
I Shouldn't Be Alive (2005-2010) as Roy Davidson / Mark Sorensen
Timewatch (2005) as Walter C. Langer
Strange But True (1996) as Reconstruction Cast

Radio
The Women's Room, Valley of the Dolls, Cruel Sunset, Gunned Down, One of Ours and 1000 Acres.

References

External links
 
 Agent: Gardner Herrity
 Spotlight

1965 births
Living people
British male television actors
Actors from Torrance, California
People from Newport Pagnell
California State University, Long Beach alumni